The following highways are numbered 617:

Canada

Costa Rica
 National Route 617

United States